The 1994 Pacific hurricane season was the final season of the eastern north Pacific's consecutive active hurricane seasons that started in 1982. The season officially started on May 15, 1994, in the eastern Pacific, and on June 1, 1994, in the central Pacific, and lasted until November 30, 1994. These dates conventionally delimit the period of each year when most tropical cyclones form in the northeastern Pacific Ocean.  The first tropical cyclone formed on June 18, while the last system dissipated on October 26.  This season, twenty-two tropical cyclones formed in the north Pacific Ocean east of the dateline, with all but two becoming tropical storms or hurricanes.  A total of 10 hurricanes occurred, including five major hurricanes. The above average activity in 1994 was attributed to the ongoing 1990–95 El Niño at the time.

Of note in this season is an unusual spree of very intense storms; the season was the first on record to see three Category 5 hurricanes, later tied in 2002 and 2018. Hurricanes Emilia, Gilma, John, and Olivia all reached a pressure below 930 millibars. Elsewhere, Hurricane Rosa caused four casualties in Mexico as the basin's only landfalling tropical storm or hurricane,  and later was responsible for flooding in Texas.

Season summary 

This season, twenty-two tropical cyclones formed in the north Pacific Ocean east of the dateline. All but two of them became tropical storms or hurricanes. In the Eastern Pacific region (140°W to North America), nineteen tropical depressions formed, of which seventeen became tropical storms, nine further intensifying into hurricanes, and five ultimately reaching major hurricanes of Category 3 intensity or higher on the Saffir–Simpson scale. These numbers are slightly above the long-term averages of fifteen tropical storms, nine hurricanes, and four major hurricanes.

In the Central Pacific Hurricane Center's area of responsibility (140°W to the International Date Line), three depressions, two tropical storms, and one hurricane formed. Overall, there were eleven tropical cyclones, eight tropical storms, five hurricanes, and three major hurricanes that formed or entered the Central Pacific region. These numbers are well above the long-term average of four tropical cyclones, two hurricanes, one tropical storm, and two depressions. The exceptionally high activity was contributed to by an El Niño ongoing at the time.

The only named storm to make landfall this year was Hurricane Rosa, which killed four people in Western Mexico and forced over 400 to be evacuated. Other notable storms include Hurricane Olivia, a high-end Category 4 system, the three Category 5 hurricanes Emilia, Gilma, and John. Both John and Hurricane Li existed in two of the three basins (East, and West) of the Pacific Ocean.

This season marked the end of the Northeastern Pacific's most recent active period, which began in 1982, and at the time, included the five most active Pacific hurricane seasons. Beginning in 1995, multi-decadal factors switched to a phase that suppressed Pacific hurricane activity. After 1994, Pacific hurricane seasons were generally been below normal, with the exception of 1997, until 2014.

The 1994 Pacific hurricane season set several records. First, three hurricanes reached Category 5 intensity on the Saffir–Simpson hurricane scale, setting a record later tied in 2002, then tied again in 2018. Hurricane John lasted longer and spent more time tropical than any other tropical cyclone on Earth in recorded history.  Eleven tropical cyclones entered or formed in the central Pacific, a record shared with the 1992 season until the 2015 season broke the record. Finally, of the four most intense hurricanes recorded in the Central Pacific, three of them occurred this season.

The season began with the formation of Tropical Depression One-E on June 18 and ended with the dissipation of Tropical Depression Nona on October 26. No named systems formed in May, three in June, four in July, five in August, six in September, two in October, and none in November. The total length of the season, from the formation of the first depression to the dissipation of the last, was 130 days.

Accumulated cyclone energy (ACE) is a measure of how active a hurricane season is. It is calculated by squaring the windspeed of a cyclone with at least tropical storm-force winds every six hours, summing the results, and dividing that total by 104. As a tropical cyclone does not have gale-force winds until it becomes a tropical storm, tropical depressions are not included in these tables. For all storms, ACE is given to three significant figures. The ACE in the east Pacific proper (140°W to North America) is given; the ACE in the central Pacific (the International Date Line to 140°W) is given in brackets. The table includes the ACE for Li and John only during those storm's time east of the dateline. Their ACE west of the dateline is part of the totals of the 1994 typhoon season. The National Hurricane Center uses ACE to rank hurricane seasons as above-normal, near-normal, and below-normal. It defines below-normal as having an ACE less than 95*104 kt2 kt2; It defines above normal as having an ACE above 150*104 kt2 along with the numbers of any two of the following above average: tropical storms (15), hurricanes (9), or major hurricanes (4); It defines near-normal as having an ACE between 100*104 kt2 and 150*104 kt2, or an ACE above 150*104 kt2 with fewer than two of the numbers of the following above average: tropical storms (15), hurricanes (9), or major hurricanes (4). Excluding the central Pacific, there were a total of seventeen tropical storms, nine hurricanes, and five major hurricanes. Altogether, the total ACE of this season was 185*104 kt2. This qualifies this season as above-normal.

Systems

Tropical Storm Aletta 

Tropical Depression One-E formed from an area of disturbed weather on June 18. It strengthened to Tropical Storm Aletta the next day. It continued intensifying and reached its peak intensity on June 20. Vertical wind shear began to weaken the storm thereafter.  The weakening trend continued, weakening Aletta to a depression on June 21. The system dissipated June 23. Aletta's remnant low, however, could be tracked on satellite images for days following the storm. The low finally dissipated north of Hawaii. Aletta never affected land, and no damage or casualties were reported.

Tropical Storm Bud 

The depression headed west-northwest, gradually turned to the northwest, and strengthened into Tropical Storm Bud on June 27. Early the next day, Bud peaked in intensity. Shear caused by a nearby upper-level low slowly weakened Bud. Later on June 28, a second center of circulation developed. The two centers started a Fujiwhara interaction. The second center then became dominant and the first one vanished. This confused structure is similar to what happened to Tropical Storm Arlene (1993). This confused structure also weakened Bud to a tropical depression on the afternoon of the same day the second center formed. Bud then headed westward over cool waters and dissipated on June 29. Tropical Storm Bud spent its entire life over the open ocean far from land areas. No casualties or damage was reported.

Hurricane Carlotta 

The tropical depression that would be Carlotta formed on June 28. It quickly became Tropical Storm Carlotta, and a large eye became visible. Because of this, the NHC upgraded the storm to a hurricane. Carlotta peaked in intensity on July 1, as a  hurricane. It gradually weakened as it moved into cooler waters, dissipating on July 5. Carlotta did not threaten land.

Other than there, Carlotta caused no damage or deaths.

Tropical Storm Daniel 

Upper-level outflow improved, and Daniel peaked in intensity on July 9. Daniel slowly declined as it continued westward. It entered the central Pacific on July 11. Wind shear weakened Daniel as it approached the Big Island, and by July 15 had degenerated into an open wave.

When Daniel was approaching Hawaii, moderate surf of  impacted the south and southeast shores of the Big Island on July 13 and 14. That day, they caused rainfall on windward slopes of the Big Island locally reaching . No reports of damage or casualties were received.

Hurricane Emilia 

On July 16, an area of low pressure associated with a tropical wave organized into Tropical Depression Five-E. It strengthened into Tropical Storm Emilia later that day. It moved west-northwest and strengthened into a hurricane. It entered the central Pacific on July 17. It continued intensifying, reaching Category 5 intensity on July 19, the first Category 5 Pacific hurricane since Ava. Emilia started weakening quickly on July 21. It weakened to a tropical storm on July 23 and dissipated two days later.

Winds caused minor damage, and rain was moderate. No one was killed.

Tropical Storm Fabio 

A tropical depression formed on July 19. Later that day, it strengthened into Tropical Storm Fabio. Fabio headed generally west or northwestward. It entered the central Pacific as a tropical depression, and dissipated on July 24.

Fabio's remnants brought locally heavy rainfall to Hawaii, reaching . No one was killed and there was no damage.

Hurricane Gilma 

Part of a tropical wave organized into a tropical depression on July 21. It headed westward and out to sea, strengthening into a tropical storm the next day. Gilma rapidly strengthened and became a hurricane exactly one day after it was named. It continued to intensify as it entered the central Pacific. Shortly after entering the central Pacific, Gilma reached  Category 5 intensity on the Saffir–Simpson hurricane scale, the second of the season. It then suddenly weakened for unexplained reasons, and weakened into a tropical storm on July 27. It became a depression three days after that and dissipated on July 31. Hurricane Gilma had minor impact on Johnston Atoll. That atoll received light rain, wind gusts to near gale force, and surf. No casualties or damage were reported.

Hurricane Gilma was the second most-intense Pacific hurricane at the time. As of 2019, it is tied with Hurricane Walaka as the tenth-most intense. Gilma is also the strongest July storm in the Eastern or Central Pacific.

Hurricane Li 

A tropical disturbance southwest of Cabo San Lucas organized into Tropical Depression Eight-E on July 31. It headed west-northwest without strengthening much, and crossed into the central Pacific on August 2. Eight-E developed a second center of circulation, which became dominant, and then became bound up in the Intertropical Convergence Zone. Eight-E then became disorganized, with multiple centers of circulation, and advisories were discontinued on August 5. The depression's remains continued their westward path well south of the Hawaiian Islands. The depression regenerated on August 8. It soon strengthened into a tropical storm and was named Li, which is Hawaiian for "Lee". Li approached the dateline on its generally westward heading. Just before crossing, it intensified into a minimal Category 1 hurricane. It crossed the dateline on August 12 and became a storm in the 1994 Pacific typhoon season. Wind shear from a tropical upper-tropospheric trough weakened back into a tropical storm as it crossed the dateline, and the Joint Typhoon Warning Center downgraded Li with its first advisory. Li stayed a tropical storm until August 16, where it weakened into a tropical depression. The system then began recurving, and dissipated on August 18. A weakening Tropical Depression Li caused showers on Wake Island. Other than there, Li had no impact on any land, and no casualties or damage were reported.

Hurricane Li is one of only six tropical cyclones to exist on all three tropical cyclone basins in the Pacific Ocean. It is also one of only six systems to form as a depression in the east Pacific but be named in the central; the others are Lala, Iniki, Lana, Ela and Ulika.

Tropical Storm Hector 

On August 7, a tropical depression formed from a tropical wave a few hundred miles south of Baja California. It became Tropical Storm Hector quickly, and as it paralleled the coast of Mexico, it began to weaken, dissipating on August 10. No damage was reported anywhere.

Tropical Storm Hector was forecast to approach the Baja California Peninsula. A tropical storm watch was issued for part of the peninsula on August 8. It was lifted later the same day. Hector's most significant impact was rain. The tropical storm dumped rain along a discontinuous zone of coastal and inland Mexico. No damage or casualties were reported.

Tropical Depression One-C 

The depression moved westward without organizing, and dissipated on August 14.

The flooding closed all major roads in Hilo, and was considered the worst flooding in 40 years. The rainfall destroyed two homes and damaged 214, 14 severely. It also damaged roads and businesses. Damage throughout the island totaled to $5 million (1994 USD; $  USD). Flooding occurred in Maui as well, where landslides blocked portions of the Hana Highway. One-C's point maximum of  makes it Hawaii's ninth wettest known tropical cyclone.

Hurricane Ileana 

A disturbance that was part of the Intertropical Convergence Zone developed several centers of circulation. It was upgraded to Tropical Storm Ileana at the second advisory, at the same time as John, the next storm. An eye appeared, and Ileana became a hurricane on August 12. It began weakening almost immediately thereafter, as it passed over cooler waters and encountered increasing wind shear. Although Ileana paralleled the coast of Mexico, watches and warnings were not issued because winds of tropical storm-force were not expected to affect land. No one was killed and there was no damage reported in association with this cyclone.

Hurricane John 

Tropical Depression Ten-E formed on August 11 south of Mexico. It headed generally westward, and was upgraded into a tropical storm twelve hours after it formed and was named John. John fluctuated in strength as it headed west, always managing to stay at tropical storm strength. On August 20, steady intensification began, and John was a major hurricane when it entered the central Pacific. It continued westward, reaching Category 5 intensity on August 23. John stayed at hurricane intensity until it crossed the dateline on August 28, becoming a typhoon of the 1994 Pacific typhoon season. After weakening into a tropical storm, John recurved, looped, and recurved again. It reintensified, and was a hurricane when it recrossed the dateline to reenter the central Pacific. John headed north-northeast until it went extratropical on September 10, thirty one days after it formed.

Ahead of the hurricane, the 1100 people at Johnston Atoll evacuated. On the atoll, John caused $15 million (1994 USD; $  USD) in damage. No deaths were reported. Other than on Johnston, Hurricane John had minor effects in Hawaii. Its remnants also affected Alaska.

Hurricane John was the longest lasting, until it was surpassed by Cyclone Freddy in 2023 and farthest traveling tropical cyclone on Earth in recorded history. It is also one of six tropical cyclones to exist in all three basins of the Pacific Ocean, an uncommon west-to-east dateline crosser, and one of the few tropical cyclone to cross the dateline more than once.

Hurricane Kristy 

It was named Tropical Storm Kristy on August 30. As it crossed into the central Pacific, a banding-type eye formed and it became a hurricane. Twelve hours later, it reached Category 2 intensity. Kristy weakened steadily from that point due to wind shear. The lowest central pressure of Kristy is unknown. The last estimate was made when Kirsty was still a tropical storm.

As it approached the Hawaiian Islands, a high surf advisory and a high wind warning were issued for the Big Island of Hawaii. No damage or deaths were reported in association with this system. Its remnants crossed 180th meridian very early on September 7 and was absorbed by a tropical depression which became Typhoon Melissa in the Western Pacific basin.

Hurricane Lane 

The same tropical wave that spawned Tropical Depression Five in the Atlantic became Tropical Depression Fourteen-E on September 3. It quickly became Tropical Storm Lane. A high pressure ridge centered itself north of Lane, keeping the storm on a westward track. This brought Lane into very favorable conditions, and Lane intensified. The high pressure ridge shifted eastward, and allowed Lane to enter unfavorable conditions. Lane dissipated on September 10.

Tropical Storm Mele 

A tropical disturbance became Tropical Depression Two-C on September 6. It reached tropical storm strength the next day, being named Mele. The name Mele means "song" in the Hawaiian language and is also the Hawaiian form of "Mary". Mele headed west-northwest and weakened back into a tropical depression on September 9. It dissipated later that day without incident.

Tropical Storm Miriam 

Miriam formed from a weak disturbance on September 15. It strengthened slightly into Tropical Storm Miriam, and dissipated on September 21, having led an uneventful life without impact. In an interesting occurrence, the low-level remnants of Miriam were still visible for weeks after the storm dissipated near 140°W.

Tropical Storm Norman 

A tropical depression formed on September 19, and became Tropical Storm Norman the next day. After tracking northwest, it began to turn north in response to a trough, and convection began to diminish. Norman dissipated on September 22 without having ever affected land.

Hurricane Olivia 

Hurricane Olivia ultimately formed from a disturbance that had separated from the Intertropical Convergence Zone and become distinct by September 19. The depression headed west-northwestwards and strengthened into Tropical Storm Olivia on September 22. It steadily intensified and was a hurricane on September 24. It then rapidly strengthened into a powerful major hurricane. It slowly curled to the northwest as it was observed by NOAA research aircraft. Olivia peaked in intensity on September 25. Meanwhile, a large cyclone off the extreme southern part of California induced a northward path. As Olivia started a small anticyclonic loop, wind shear began to weaken the hurricane. When Olivia was finished the loop, it had weakened to a tropical storm. It then headed westward. It weakened into a tropical depression on September 28 and dissipated the next day. No impact was reported.

At the time, Olivia was the third-most intense Pacific hurricane on record; it has since dropped to eleventh. The storm also had the lowest barometric pressure of a Category 4 Pacific hurricane on record. In 2001, Hurricane Juliette joined Olivia as the most intense Category 4 hurricane on record. In 2014, Hurricane Odile beat both storms when it attained a minimum pressure of 918 mbars. At the time, Olivia was also the most intense September hurricane, but was surpassed by Hurricane Linda in 1997, and is currently the third most intense September hurricane in the Pacific basin.

Tropical Storm Paul 

A nearly stationary cluster of thunderstorms and convection that had been hanging around since September 15 and escaped destruction by Tropical Storm Miriam organized into Tropical Depression Eighteen-E on September 24. It was located between Miriam's remnants and the developing Olivia. It became Tropical Storm Paul on the afternoon of September 25. It peaked in intensity on September 27. Then, upper outflow from the nearby Olivia started shearing the tropical cyclone. Paul had been completely destroyed by September 30. The tropical cyclone never threatened land, and consequently, no damage or deaths were reported.

Hurricane Rosa 

An area of disturbed weather organized into a tropical depression at midday on October 8. It had trouble organizing, and advisories were discontinued for a while. The cyclone finally became a tropical storm on October 11 and was named Rosa. It moved glacially, but eventually a trough steered Rosa north and then northeast. Rosa intensified quickly, peaking at Category 2 intensity just before landfall near La Concepción on the morning of October 14. Rosa quickly decayed over the mountains of Mexico, and its cloud shield rapidly accelerated northward through the United States, spreading moisture.

On October 12, a hurricane watch was issued for the coast from Culiacán to Manzanillo and the Baja California Peninsula south of latitude 24°N. At the same time, a tropical storm warning was issued from Manzanillo to Tepic. On October 14, a hurricane warning was issued for the coast between Culiacán and Cabo Corrientes, Jalisco, and a tropical storm warning south of Cabo Corrientes to Manzanillo. All watches and warnings were lifted later that day.

Four deaths, two in each of Nayarit and Durango, were reported. Four people were missing in Sinaloa. All of the deaths were due to drowning. More than 100,000 people had their homes damaged in Nayarit. Telephone poles and power lines were downed in Sinaloa. Rain caused landslides and flash-flooding in mountainous areas. In Jalisco, mudslides forced the evacuation of 400 people from two coastal villages. The moisture Rosa sent into the United States was a contributing factor in record rains in parts of southeastern Texas from October 15 to 19. Those rains caused flooding that killed 22 people, destroyed over 3000 homes, and caused US$700 million in damage.

Tropical Storm Nona 

Tropical Depression Three-C formed on October 21 in the Central Pacific basin. It traveled westward for about 4 days before strengthening to Tropical Storm Nona on October 25. The name "Nona" is Hawaiian for the Latin name spelled the same way. Nona immediately weakened back into a tropical depression. Upper-level westerlies from a nearby trough destroyed the depression on October 26. No deaths or damage were reported. Nona was a tropical storm for six hours, the minimum possible time.

Other systems 
On August 14, an area of convection organized enough to be considered a tropical depression. It was steered by John's circulation, and it was never expected to strengthen much because it was close to cool waters. The cyclone drifted north, then northeast, north again, northwest, and then west. The National Hurricane Center declared the depression dissipated on August 15. The depression had no effects anywhere.

According to the Joint Typhoon Warning Center and Japan Meteorological Agency, on October 21, a tropical depression formed west of the International Date Line, and soon exited CPHC's area of responsibility. the system subsequently became Tropical Storm Yuri.

Storm names 
The following names were used for named storms that formed in the Northeastern Pacific Ocean during 1994. Names that were not assigned this season are marked in gray. No names were retired, so this same list was used again in the 2000 season. This is the same list used for the 1988 season except for Ileana, which replaced Iva and was used for the first time in 1994.

For storms that form in the Central Pacific Hurricane Center's area of responsibility, encompassing the area between 140 degrees west and the International Date Line, all names are used in a series of four rotating lists. The next four names that were slated for use in 1994 are shown below. Three of them, Li, Mele, and Nona, were used throughout the course of the year.

Season effects 
This is a table of all the storms that have formed in the 1994 Pacific hurricane season. It includes their duration, names, landfall(s), denoted in parentheses, damages, and death totals. Deaths in parentheses are additional and indirect (an example of an indirect death would be a traffic accident), but were still related to that storm. Damage and deaths include totals while the storm was extratropical, a wave, or a low, and all the damage figures are in 1994 USD.

Notes

See also 

List of Pacific hurricanes
Pacific hurricane season
1994 Atlantic hurricane season
1994 Pacific typhoon season
1994 North Indian Ocean cyclone season
South-West Indian Ocean cyclone season: 1993–94, 1994–95
Australian region cyclone season: 1993–94, 1994–95
South Pacific cyclone season: 1993–94, 1994–95

References

External links 

 NHC 1994 Pacific hurricane season archive
 Central Pacific Hurricane Center archive

 
Pacific hurricane seasons
Articles which contain graphical timelines